Morten Espersen (born 21 June 1951) is a Danish rower. He competed in the men's quadruple sculls event at the 1980 Summer Olympics.

References

External links
 

1951 births
Living people
Danish male rowers
Olympic rowers of Denmark
Rowers at the 1980 Summer Olympics
Rowers from Copenhagen
World Rowing Championships medalists for Denmark